Ghana competed at the 1960 Summer Olympics in Rome, Italy, for the first time as an independent nation.  Previously, the Gold Coast had competed at the 1952 Summer Olympics. In total, 15 athletes competing in 2 sports represented Ghana.

Medalists
Ghana won its first ever Olympic medal at these Games.

Athletics

Key
Note–Ranks given for track events are within the athlete's heat only
Q = Qualified for the next round
q = Qualified for the next round as a fastest loser or, in field events, by position without achieving the qualifying target
N/A = Round not applicable for the event
Bye = Athlete not required to compete in round

Men
Track & road events

Field events

Boxing

References

External links
Official Olympic Reports
International Olympic Committee results database

Nations at the 1960 Summer Olympics
1960
Olympics